Liam Dawson is a former Australian rules footballer who played for the Brisbane Lions in the Australian Football League (AFL). He made his AFL debut in round 8, 2015 against  at Etihad Stadium. Dawson was delisted by the Lions at the end of the 2018 season, having played 18 games. 

Dawson was born in Australia to an English mother (and Australian rules umpire). He  played in the Redcliffe juniors, then Aspley juniors at age 16, before debuting for the senior Hornets at age 17. He represented Queensland at under 18 level. Dawson was part of the Lions Academy and the AFL Academy and was part of the AIS-AFL Europe tour.

References

External links 

1996 births
Living people
Brisbane Lions players
Aspley Football Club players
Australian rules footballers from Queensland